Feeding Frenzy: Jimmy Buffett Live! is a live album by American popular music singer-songwriter Jimmy Buffett.  It was initially released in October 1990 as MCA 10022.  It is the second of Buffett's many live albums.

The album's material was culled from several concerts at Lakewood Amphitheatre in Atlanta, Georgia and Riverbend Music Center in Cincinnati, Ohio in August 1990 and was remixed by Elliot Scheiner at The Hit Factory Studios in New York City.

Chart performance
Feeding Frenzy reached No. 68 on the Billboard 200 album chart.

Songs
The album featured many of Buffett's concert favorites as well as two new songs that have not appeared on any other Buffett album: "In the City" penned by Coral Reefer Mac McAnally and Lord Burgess' calypso classic "Jamaica Farewell."  "A Love Song (From a Different Point of View)" is the title given to "Why Don't We Get Drunk" and "Today's Message" is a spoken-word introduction to it.  "Everlasting Moon" appears on the box set Boats, Beaches, Bars & Ballads.

Notably absent from the album, but played live, is "Changes in Latitudes, Changes in Attitudes," the only one of "The Big 8" missing.  Although no set list from the shows have circulated, other shows from the same tour conclude that much of the playlist order was changed.

(Basic set list structure from the tour):
"You'll Never Work in Dis Bidness Again"
"Stars on the Water"**
"Off to See the Lizard"**
"Come Monday"
"Last Mango in Paris"*
"Today's Message"
"Why Don't We Get Drunk (And Screw)"
"Grapefruit-Juicy Fruit"**
"If The Phone Doesn't Ring, It's Me"**
"The City"*
"One Particular Harbour"
Acoustic performance, changed from show to show
Acoustic performance, changed from show to show
"Everlasting Moon"/"Honey Do"
"Cheeseburger in Paradise"
"A Pirate Looks at Forty"
"Jolly Mon Sing"
"Gypsies in the Palace"
"Fins"
"Changes in Latitudes, Changes in Attitudes"**
"Margaritaville"
("Pascagoula Run")**  Encore:
"Jamaica Farewell"
"Volcano"

(*) = Appears on Feeding Frenzy, but out of order.
(**) = Doesn't appear on Feeding Frenzy at all.

Songs 12 and 13 changed from show to show, such as: "Pencil Thin Mustache", "Havaña Daydreamin'", "Son of a Son of a Sailor", "Coast of Marseilles", "The Weather is Here, Wish You Were Beautiful", "Migration", "The Captain & the Kid", "Lone Palm", "Little Miss Magic", "Rocky Raccoon", "Tin Cup Chalice" and "He Went to Paris".

"Everlasting Moon" and "Honey Do" switched back and forth from show to show, while "Pascagoula Run" would either be played or dropped.

Track listings
"You'll Never Work in Dis Bidness Again"(Jimmy Buffett, Josh Leo, Matt Betton, Vince Melamed, Michael Utley, Willie Weeks) – 4:50 (Tuesday August 7, 1990, in Cincinnati, OH)
"The City"(Mac McAnally) – 4:40 (Wednesday August 8, 1990, in Cincinnati, OH)
"Last Mango in Paris"(Jimmy Buffett, Marshall Chapman, Will Jennings, Michael Utley) – 3:38 (Friday August 3, 1990, in Atlanta, GA)
"Come Monday"(Jimmy Buffett) – 3:52 (Saturday August 4, 1990, in Atlanta, GA)
"Today's Message"(Jimmy Buffett) – 6:25 (Tuesday August 7, 1990, in Cincinnati, OH)
"A Love Song (From a Different Point of View)"(Jimmy Buffett) – 3:27 (Tuesday August 7, 1990, in Cincinnati, OH)
"One Particular Harbour"(Jimmy Buffett, Bobby Holcomb) – 6:24 (Tuesday August 7, 1990, in Cincinnati, OH)
"Honey Do"(Jimmy Buffett, Michael Utley) – 4:53 (Friday August 3, 1990, in Atlanta, GA)
"Cheeseburger in Paradise"(Jimmy Buffett) – 3:10 (Tuesday August 7, 1990, in Cincinnati, OH)
"A Pirate Looks at Forty"(Jimmy Buffett) – 4:25 (Friday August 3, 1990, in Atlanta, GA)
"Jolly Mon Sing"(Jimmy Buffett, Michael Utley, Will Jennings) – 4:58 (Tuesday August 7, 1990, in Cincinnati, OH)
"Gypsies in the Palace"(Jimmy Buffett, Glenn Frey, Will Jennings) – 4:15 (Tuesday August 7, 1990, in Cincinnati, OH)
"Fins"(Jimmy Buffett, Barry Chance, Tom Corcoran, Deborah McColl) – 4:35 (Tuesday August 7, 1990, in Cincinnati, OH)
"Margaritaville"(Jimmy Buffett) – 4:15 (Friday August 3, 1990, in Atlanta, GA)
"Jamaica Farewell"(Lord Burgess) – 3:30 (Tuesday August 7, 1990, in Cincinnati, OH)
"Volcano"(Jimmy Buffett, Keith Sykes, Harry Dailey) – 4:10 (Wednesday August 8, 1990, in Cincinnati, OH)

Personnel
The Coral Reefer Band:
Jimmy Buffett – guitar, vocal
Peter Mayer – guitar, vocals
Jim Mayer – bass, vocals
Roger Guth – drums
Michael Utley – keyboards
Jay Oliver – keyboards
Robert Greenidge – steel drums, percussion
Greg "Fingers" Taylor – harmonica
Brie Howard – percussion, vocals
Savannah Jane Buffett – percussion
Ralph MacDonald – percussion
Mary Harris – vocals
Dena Iverson – vocals
Katherine Maisnik – vocals
Mac McAnally – guitars, vocals
Zachary Richard – acadian accordion

Production
Jimmy Buffett, Elliot Scheiner – producers
Elliot Scheiner – Recording Engineer
 Mark Harder – Digital Editing
Remote Recording Services Inc. With David Hewitt, Phil Gitomer, Bryan Leskowicz, and Pat Lynes
Ted Jensen at Sterling Sound, NYC – mastering

Notes

External links
Complete album art and liner notes at BuffettNews.com

1990 live albums
Jimmy Buffett live albums
MCA Records live albums